Font Hill Beach is located in St Elizabeth, on the south coast of Jamaica, between Black River and White House. It is within a nature reserve on the Font Hill property owned by the Petroleum Company of Jamaica. It is an attractive, well kept beach with clean golden sand and safe swimming in a roped off area. Beyond the rope there is a shallow reef.

Font Hill Beach is sometimes very popular at weekends and holidays, but is usually quiet during weekdays.

The facilities include lifeguards, a grassed area with picnic tables under gazebos, bar, showers, changing rooms and toilets, lockers etc.  Entry to the beach park is controlled by a guard and cost J$350 for adults,$175 for children and the group rate is $240 per person (in Sept 2008). It is open 9am to 5pm, every day of the week.

Font Hill Beach Park is currently closed to the public until further notice.

See also
 List of beaches in Jamaica

References

External links
Aerial view
Petroleum Company of Jamaica
Font Hill Villas & Beach Park

Beaches of Jamaica
Geography of Saint Elizabeth Parish
Tourist attractions in Saint Elizabeth Parish